Das Keyboard is a series of computer keyboards sold by Metadot Corporation, a software company located in Austin, Texas. Some models feature blank keycaps,  made with the purpose to help improve touch typing skills. The current iterations employ mechanical keyswitches manufactured by either Cherry or Greetech. It is worth to note that "the keyboard" in German is "die Tastatur", not "das Tastatur".

Das Keyboard products

There have been multiple generations of Das Keyboard:

The first iteration, released in 2005, did not feature mechanical key switches, but in addition to the blank keycaps, it featured a Model-M-inspired design, and individually weighted keypresses, because some keys are pressed with less force than other keys.

The second iteration in 2006 introduced mechanical key switches using Cherry MX Blue switches.

The third iteration in 2008 was the first to be offered in both Ultimate (unlabeled) and Professional (labeled) versions. This USB-only keyboard also offered six-key rollover capability (the maximum for a conventional USB HID keyboard), an internal two-port USB hub and came with a glossy surface. Both 104-key (ANSI) and 105-key layouts (ISO) were offered.
This version was not without its problems, however, as it became known that key transposition errors could occur at high typing speeds. In addition, interoperability issues related to the USB hub and lack of power were noticed with some systems.

The "Das Keyboard Model S" was introduced in late 2009, and continues to be sold today. It contains revised electronics to address many common complaints along with supporting media keys and PS/2 operation. Again, it is shipped in both Ultimate (unlabeled) and Professional (labeled) versions, both 104- and 105-key, with the addition of a labeled Professional Silent model  featuring non-clicky but tactile MX brown stem keyswitches. The latter is intended for applications demanding lower noise levels than obtained with the regular clicky MX blue stem switches while retaining a similar tactile characteristic.

The "Das Keyboard 4" was introduced in 2014, featuring new aesthetics and improved construction. As with previous models, it was available in an Ultimate (unlabelled) configuration, as well as a more standard Professional  version with key legends.

In 2015, some versions of Das Keyboards began shipping with Cherry MX clone switches manufactured by Greetech. The "Das Keyboard 4" for Windows continues to be sold with Cherry MX switches, but the Mac version and the "Das Keyboard 4C" models all feature the clone switches instead. This move has been somewhat controversial, as the clone switches are cheaper and of unknown but almost definitely different quality/durability. However, as of 2016, Das Keyboard discontinued the use of Greetech switches to use only the Cherry brand for MX switch type.

In June 2016, the "Das Keyboard 5Q" was introduced on Kickstarter. The new keyboard was to be cloud connected, allowing various online services to send signals to the keyboard which would result in various lighting effects. Backers were promised delivery in January 2017, but Das Keyboard encountered over a year of delays. Most backers did not receive their keyboards until the second quarter of 2018. The accompanying software only functions on Windows, despite the promise of full cross platform support of Mac and Linux. The open source project DieFarbe, not endorsed by Das Keyboard, attempts to implement the Windows driver's feature set for other operating systems.

The 4Q and 5Q models are now available for linux as well as windows.

Security concerns 
After Metadot Corporation's attempts to censor an alternative, open source driver, security concerns arose. Das Keyboard 5Q's cloud connection driver was questioned by some users due to the possibility of being a remote keylogger.

See also
 Unicomp
 FrogPad
 Happy Hacking Keyboard
 Model M keyboard
 Optimus Maximus keyboard
 Touch typing
 Keyboard layout changer

References

External links
 Official Das Keyboard homepage
 Metadot Corporation (maker of Das Keyboard)

Computer keyboard models